Ramón Salvador Cabrera (born November 5, 1989) is a Venezuelan professional baseball catcher who is currently a free agent. He previously played in Major League Baseball (MLB) for the Cincinnati Reds.

Career

Pittsburgh Pirates
On April 11, 2008, Cabrera signed with the Pittsburgh Pirates organization as an undrafted free agent. He made his professional debut with the Venezuelan Summer League Pirates, and hit .264 in 56 games. In 2009, Cabrera split the year between the VSL Pirates and the GCL Pirates, hitting .299 in 57 games between the two teams. For the 2010 season, Cabrera played for the Single-A West Virginia Power, slashing .269/.312/.342 with 1 home run and 40 RBI in 90 games. The following season, he played for the High-A Bradenton Marauders, batting .343/.410/.471 with career-highs in home runs (3) and RBI (53). Cabrera played in 112 games for the Double-A Altoona Curve in 2012, also appearing in 1 game for the Triple-A Indianapolis Indians, and hit .278/.343/.370 with 3 home runs and 50 RBI. On November 20, 2012, the Pirates added Cabrera to the 40-man roster to protect him from the Rule 5 Draft.

Detroit Tigers
On December 5, 2012, Cabrera was traded to the Detroit Tigers in exchange for Andy Oliver. He split the 2013 season between the Double-A Erie SeaWolves and the Triple-A Toledo Mud Hens, accumulating a .284/.367/.371 slash line with 1 home run and 69 RBI. He was assigned to Erie to begin the 2014 season, and played in 107 games, slashing .277/.329/.358 and earning Eastern League All-Star honors.

Pittsburgh Pirates (second stint)
On August 13, 2014, Cabrera was claimed off waivers by the Pittsburgh Pirates. He finished the year with Double-A Altoona, going 11-for-46 (.239) in 12 games. The Pirates designated Cabrera for assignment on November 20, 2014, and released him on November 24.

Cincinnati Reds
On December 9, 2014, Cabrera signed a minor league contract with the Cincinnati Reds organization. He was assigned to the Triple-A Louisville Bats of the International League to begin the 2015 season. The Reds selected Cabrera to the 40-man roster and promoted him to the major leagues for the first time on September 1, 2015. He made his major league debut on September 5 as a pinch hitter for Ryan LaMarre, and flew out in his only at-bat. He finished his rookie year 11-for-30 in 13 games with 1 home run and 3 RBI. He split the 2016 season between Louisville and Cincinnati, slashing .246/.279/.357 with 3 home runs and 23 RBI in 61 games for the Reds. On November 28, 2016, Cabrera was designated for assignment. He was non-tendered on by Cincinnati December 2, and became a free agent.

Miami Marlins
On January 12, 2017, Cabrera signed a minor league contract with the Miami Marlins that included an invitation to spring training. He spent the year with the Triple-A New Orleans Baby Cakes, hitting .217/.278/.354 with 5 home runs and 23 RBI. He elected free agency on November 6, 2017.

Long Island Ducks
On May 14, 2018, Cabrera signed with the Long Island Ducks of the Atlantic League of Professional Baseball. In 84 games for Long Island, Cabrera logged a .268/.289/.364 slash line with 3 home runs and 31 RBI. On April 8, 2019, Cabrera re-signed with the Ducks for the 2019 season. In 66 games for the Ducks, Cabrera slashed .249/.279/.397 with 7 home runs and 25 RBI. He became a free agent following the season. On January 27, 2020, Cabrera again re-signed with the Ducks for the 2020 season. However, Cabrera did not play in a game in 2020 following the cancellation of the Atlantic League season because of the COVID-19 pandemic. He became a free agent after the year.

Ibaraki Astro Planets
On January 12, 2021, Cabrera signed with the Ibaraki Astro Planets of the Baseball Challenge League in Japan. He became a free agent after the 2021 season.

See also
 List of Major League Baseball players from Venezuela

References

External links

Living people
1989 births
Altoona Curve players
Bradenton Marauders players
Cincinnati Reds players
Erie SeaWolves players
Gulf Coast Pirates players
Indianapolis Indians players
Leones del Caracas players
Long Island Ducks players
Louisville Bats players
Major League Baseball catchers
Major League Baseball players from Venezuela
Mexican League baseball catchers
New Orleans Baby Cakes players
Baseball players from Caracas
Tigres de Aragua players
Toledo Mud Hens players
Venezuelan expatriate baseball players in Mexico
Venezuelan expatriate baseball players in the United States
Venezuelan people of Japanese descent
Venezuelan Summer League Pirates players
West Virginia Power players
Venezuelan expatriate baseball players in Japan